Love is an American romantic comedy-drama streaming television series created by Judd Apatow, Lesley Arfin, and Paul Rust. The series stars Rust, Gillian Jacobs, Mike Mitchell, and Claudia O'Doherty. Netflix originally ordered two seasons of the show. The first 10-episode season was made available on February 19, 2016, and a 12-episode second season premiered on March 10, 2017. Netflix renewed the series for a third season one month prior to the second-season premiere. On December 15, 2017, Netflix announced that the third season would be its last. Season 3 premiered on March 9, 2018.

Summary
The series is presented as a "down-to-earth look at dating", exploring male and female perspectives on romantic relationships through the characters Mickey and Gus, played by Jacobs and Rust, respectively. Mickey and Gus are two untrustworthy people, each with significant emotional baggage, attempting to build a trusting relationship with each other; Mickey is an alcoholic, a love/sex addict, a pot stirrer, and someone who tends to be dishonest with herself and others, while Gus is awkward, emotionally needy, oblivious to social cues, and prone to occasional outbursts when things do not go his way.

Episodes

Cast

Main
 Gillian Jacobs as Mickey Dobbs
 Paul Rust as Gus Cruikshank
 Claudia O'Doherty as Bertie Bauer
 Chris Witaske as Chris Czajkowski (season 3, recurring seasons 1–2)
 Mike Mitchell as Randy Monahan

Recurring
Gus's and Mickey's family
 Kathy Baker as Vicki Cruikshank
 Ed Begley Jr. as Mark Cruikshank
 Kyle Bornheimer as Ken Cruikshank
 Drew Tarver as Andrew Cruikshank
 Daniel Stern as Marty Dobbs

Gus's coworkers
 Iris Apatow as Arya Hopkins
 Tracie Thoms as Susan Cheryl
 Jordan Rock as Kevin
 Milana Vayntrub as Natalie
 Seth Morris as Evan
 Dawn Forrester as Denise Hopkins, Arya's mother

Mickey's coworkers
 Brett Gelman as Greg Colter ("Dr. Greg")
 Bobby Lee as Truman

Mickey's friends
 Kerri Kenney as Syd
 Kyle Kinane as Eric
 Chantal Claret as Shaun
 Andy Dick as himself

Other recurring characters

 John Ross Bowie as Rob
 Steve Bannos as Frank
 Dave Gruber Allen as Allan
 David Spade as Steven Hopkins
 Eddie Pepitone as Eddie
 Saxon Sharbino as Simone
 Dawn Forrester as Denise Hopkins
 Mark Oliver Everett as Brian
 Rich Sommer as Dustin
 Kirby Howell-Baptiste as Beth
 Esther Povitsky as Alexis
 Michael Cassady as Dean
 Lisa Darr as Diane
 Briga Heelan as Heidi McAuliffe
Jason Dill as Len
 Alexandra Rushfield as Ali Rush
 Dave King as Wyatt Meyers
 Jake Elliott as Aidan
 Cristin McAlister as Britney
 Mike Hanford as Wade
 Neil Campbell as Kyle
 Armen Weitzman as Ruby
 Tim Kalpakis as Walt
 Kulap Vilaysack as Rebecca
 Jay Johnston as Pastor
 Liz Femi as Liz
 Horatio Sanz as Jeff
 Chris Redd as Justin
 Paula Pell as Erika
 Jongman Kim as Victor
 Randall Park as Tommy

Guest

 Carlos Acuña as Carlos
 Stephanie Allynne as Kelly
 Vanessa Bayer as Sarah
 Stephen Boss as Doobie
 Jesse Bradford as Carl
 Janicza Bravo as Lorna
 Danny Cole as William the Wonder
 John Early as Daniel
 Eric Edelstein as Devon Monahan
 Chase Ellison as Jacob
 Jessie Ennis as Stella
 John Ennis as Don
 Megan Ferguson as Natasha
 Rich Fulcher as Glen Michener
 Leslie Grossman as Liz
 Sandrine Holt as Jorie
 Hannah Leder as Lila
 Liz Lee as SLAA Member
 Joe Mande as Jeffrey
 Aparna Nancherla as Lauren
 Tipper Newton as Kali
 Graham Rogers as Mike
 Will Sasso as Ben
 Rory Scovel as Gator
 Jason Stuart as Dr. Powell
 Robin Tunney as Waverly
 Tyrus as Keith the Creamator
 Justin Willman as a magician
 Nancy Youngblut as Carol
 Charlyne Yi as Cori
 Catherine Waller as Emma

Reception

Critical
Love has received positive reviews from critics, with particular praise for the cast. On the review aggregator Rotten Tomatoes, season one holds an approval rating of 88 percent based on 40 reviews, with an average rating of 7.2/10. The website's critical consensus reads, "Judd Apatow's Love is an honest look at building a relationship, helped along by its two appealing leads." On Metacritic the season has an average score of 72 out of 100, based on 27 critics, indicating "generally favorable reviews".

The Hollywood Reporter and Variety reviewed the show positively but commented that the length of the episodes (up to 40 minutes) and the familiar premise do not always work in the show's favor. Daniel Fienberg at The Hollywood Reporter observes, "It's a variation on a common theme, but it's also squirmingly effective, fitfully funny and carried by a great, uncompromising performance from Gillian Jacobs...If you can warm up to the prickly, but probably realistic, characters, there's a lot to like, if not love." Alan Sepinwall of Hitfix reviewed it positively and said, "I can see all those issues, and more. I just don't care. When you feel it—as I very quickly did with Love—nothing else matters."

On Rotten Tomatoes, the second season has an approval rating of 94 percent based on 17 reviews, with an average rating of 7.19/10. The website's critical consensus reads, "In its sophomore season, Love treads the balance between comedy and drama with greater confidence, going deeper into the endearing, frustrating, delightfully realistic relationship of Mickey and Gus." On Metacritic, the season has an average score of 80 out of 100, based on 6 critics, indicating "generally favorable reviews".

Accolades
In 2017, Love was nominated for Best Musical or Comedy Series at the 21st Satellite Awards.

References

External links
 
 

2010s American comedy-drama television series
2010s American romantic comedy television series
2016 American television series debuts
2018 American television series endings
Alcohol abuse in television
English-language Netflix original programming
Television series about show business
Television series by Apatow Productions
Television series by Legendary Television
Television series created by Judd Apatow
Television shows filmed in Los Angeles
Television shows set in Los Angeles